Takeshi Ōjitani (born 9 June 1992) is a Japanese judoka.

He is the gold medallist of the 2016 Judo Grand Slam Tokyo in the +100 kg category.

References

External links
 

1992 births
Living people
Japanese male judoka
Asian Games medalists in judo
Judoka at the 2014 Asian Games
Judoka at the 2018 Asian Games
Asian Games gold medalists for Japan
Asian Games bronze medalists for Japan
Medalists at the 2014 Asian Games
Medalists at the 2018 Asian Games
20th-century Japanese people
21st-century Japanese people